National Polytechnic Institute of Lorraine (l'Institut National Polytechnique de Lorraine or Lorraine INP), based in Nancy, is a French technological university system.  It is under the Academy of Nancy and Metz.

INPL is a part of the University of Lorraine. It federates 11 engineering schools:
École nationale supérieure des mines de Nancy: general engineering
École nationale supérieure des industries chimiques (ENSIC, Nancy): chemistry
École nationale supérieure d'agronomie et des industries alimentaires (ENSAIA): agricultural engineering
École européenne d'ingénieurs en génie des matériaux (EEIGM)
École nationale supérieure d'électricité et de mécanique (ENSEM)
École nationale supérieure de géologie (ENSG)
École nationale supérieure en génie des systèmes et de l'innovation (ENSGSI)
École nationale d'ingénieurs de Metz (ENIM)
Polytech Nancy
Telecom Nancy
École Nationale Supérieure des Technologies et Industries du Bois

References

External links

University of Lorraine
Universities and colleges in Nancy, France
Educational institutions established in 1970